is a Japanese former Nippon Professional Baseball outfielder.

References 

1959 births
Living people
Baseball people from Shizuoka Prefecture 
Tokai University alumni 
Japanese baseball players
Nippon Professional Baseball outfielders
Seibu Lions players
Yokohama Taiyō Whales players
Japanese baseball coaches
Nippon Professional Baseball coaches